Valeri Grigoryevich Urin (10 August 1934 – 23 January 2023) was a Soviet football player and coach.

International career
Urin made his debut for USSR on 30 August 1958 in a friendly against Czechoslovakia.

Personal life and death
Urin was of Jewish ethnicity. He died on 23 January 2023, at the age of 88.

Honours
Dynamo Moscow
 Soviet Top League: 1957, 1959

References

External links
  Profile

1934 births
2023 deaths
Sportspeople from Yekaterinburg
Jewish Russian sportspeople
Russian footballers
Soviet footballers
Jewish footballers
Association football forwards
Soviet Union international footballers
Soviet Top League players
FC Dynamo Kirov players
FC Dynamo Moscow players
Daugava Rīga players
FC Dinamo Minsk players
FC Metalurh Zaporizhzhia players
Soviet football managers
FC Yenisey Krasnoyarsk managers